S. Spafford Ackerly (1895-1981) was distinguished professor emeritus of psychiatry, University of Louisville School of Medicine. He was a Guggenheim fellow and founded the Kentucky Psychiatric Society, of which he was president. He was vice-president of the American Psychiatric Association, and president of the American Orthopsychiatric Society. He was also a charter fellow of the American College of Psychiatrists and a life fellow of the American College of Physicians. He was a founding member of the American Academy of Child Psychiatry.

References

External links
 S. Spafford Ackerly

1895 births
1981 deaths
21st-century American physicians
American psychiatrists
University of Louisville faculty